The Canadian Screen Award for Best Lead Performance in a Film is an annual award, presented by the Academy of Canadian Cinema and Television as part of the Canadian Screen Awards program, to honour the best leading performance in a theatrical film.

It is a merger of the former awards for Best Actor and Best Actress, following the academy's announcement in August 2022 that it would start presenting gender-neutral acting awards instead of gendered ones.

2020s

References

Film awards for lead actor
Film awards for lead actress
Lead Performance
Awards established in 2023